Bedok South Secondary School (BDS) is a co-educational government secondary school in Bedok, Singapore. It is one of eight schools to be selected for the Ministry of Education's 'Teach Less, Learn More' programmes.

History
BDS was established in 1980 with a teaching staff of 50 teachers and an enrolment of 1022 students. In June 1980, the school had the entire premises to itself after initially sharing its premises with Temasek Secondary School and Hong San Primary School. It was officially opened on 29 April 1982 by Lee Chiaw Meng, Member of Parliament for Tanah Merah SMC. It used to be located along New Upper Changi Road before it was relocated to its current premises at 1 Jalan Langgar Bedok in 2003.

The new campus was officially opened on 21 February 2004 by Abdullah Tarmugi, Member of Parliament for East Coast GRC. A sports hall was constructed for the school in 2009. The school now sits on a three-hectare plot of land.

School facilities 
 School Field
 Indoor Sports Hall(ISH 1 and ISH 3)
 Eco Garden
 Art Room
 Computer Laboratory/IT facilities
 Multimedia Resource Library(Oasis@BDS)
 Study Room(Cre8 Hub)
 New Fitness Corner
 Low Element
 Science Laboratories
 NT Home Room
 Learning Space
 Think Tank

Co-curricular activities 
Uniformed groups
 NPCC (B&G)
 NCC (Land) (B)
 NCDCC (B&G)
 Girl Guides (G)
 Scouts(B)

Visual and performing arts
 Chinese Orchestra (B&G)
 Choir (B&G)
 Dance Society (Wushu)(B&G)
 Chinese Dance
 Malay Dance (B&G)
 Symphonic Band(B&G)

Sports
 Badminton (B&G)
 Football (B&G)
 Floorball (B&G)
 Netball (G)

Clubs and societies
 Infocomm and Media Club (B&G)
 Media Production Club (B&G)
 Science and Environment (B&G)

References

External links
 

Bedok
Secondary schools in Singapore